Riddim Driven is a series of various artists compilation albums released by VP Records.  Each volume of the series features tracks from multiple artists recorded over one or two reggae or dancehall riddims produced by various producers.  The series began in January 2001 with the release of the Chiney Gal & Blazing riddim album. Greensleeves Records has a similar series of compilation albums, known as Greensleeves Rhythm Album.

Discography

2001

 Chiney Gal & Blazing
 Speed & Full Moon
 Thunder & Bedroom
 Trilogy
 Extasy
 Tun It Up
 Juice
 Pressure Cooker
 Slow Down The Pace
 Rice and Peas
 Candle Wax
 Trilogy Pt. 2 & Ole Sore
 Scare Crow
 Giddeon War
 Liquid
 Nine Night
 Mr Brown Meets Number One
 Engine 54 & Humanity
 Buy Out

2002

 Glue
 Just Friends
 The Flip
 Bondage
 X5
 Renegade
 Hi Fever
 Tabla
 White Liva
 Engine
 Blindfold
 Party Time
 The Beach
 Rematch
 Mexican
 G-String
 Diesel

2003

 The Wave
 Diggy Diggy
 Washout
 Tai Chi
 44 Flat
 Hydro
 Throw Back
 Time Travel
 Sexy Lady Explosion
 Caribbean Style
 All Out
 Forensic
 Scream
 Wanted
 Good Times
 Salsa
 Adrenaline
 Earth, Wind & Flames
 Golden Bathtub
 Puppy Water
 Trafalga

2004

 Project X
 Fiesta
 Coolie Skank
 Celebration
 Hot Gal
 Flava
 Chrome
 Doctor's Darling
 Career
 Mad Instruments
 Check It Back
 Thrilla
 I Swear
 Sunlight
 Maybach
 Dancehall Rock
 Stepz
 Phantom
 Grindin
 Cookie Monster & Allo Allo
 Dreamweaver
 Hard Times
 Juicy
 Mamacita
 Tiajuana
 Tun It Up Ah Nadda Notch

2005

 Rah! Rah!
 Strip Down
 Lion Paw
 1985 Sleng Teng Extravaganza
 Ruckus
 Bubble Up
 Kopa
 Sleepy Dog
 Bingie Trod
 Return to Big Street
 Cry Baby
 My Swing
 Bad Bargain
 First Prize
 Old Truck
 Lava Splash
 Ice Breaka
 Applause
 Move
 My Baby
 Throw Back Giggy
 Sleng Teng Resurrection

2006

 R.A.W. (Ready and Willing)
 Baddis Ting
 Reflections
 Capital P
 Nookie 2K6
 Wild 2 Nite
 Smash
 Global
 Red Bull & Guinness
 Higher Octane
 Dem Time Deh
 Wipe Out
 Gully Slime
 Full Draw
 Sidewalk University
 Consuming Fire
 2 Bad Riddims 3 (Eighty-Five & Stage Show)

2007

 12 Gauge
 Dreaming
 Power Cut
 Heathen
 Tremor
 Jam Down
 Guardian Angel
 Stop the Fighting

2008

 Shaddowz (Darker Shadow, Dark Again & Shadow)
 Rub-A-Dub
 To The World: Vol. 1
 Clean Sweep

2009

 Beauty & the Beast
 Rock Steady
 Sweet
 Clearance
 Trippple Bounce

2010

 Ghetto
 Street Team
 World Premiere
 Classic

Compilation album series
Reggae compilation albums
Riddims